The Zambia Institute of Chartered Accountants (ZICA) is the only professional accountancy body in Zambia.  It is the sole organization in Zambia with the right to award the Chartered Accountant designation; and to practice in Zambia, accountants must be registered with ZICA (Accountants Act of 2008)  ZICA is a member of the International Federation of Accountants (IFAC).
ZICA is also a charter member of the Pan African Federation of Accountants, which was inaugurated on 5 May 2011.

Structure

Established under the Accountants Act of 1982 (CAP) 390, ZICA is managed by a Council consisting of 12 members of which 10 are elected by members at the AGM and 2 are nominated by the Minister of Finance and National Planning.

Accountancy Programme
The ZICA Accountancy Programme was introduced in 2007 and has since received international acceptability with the endorsement of the International Federation of Accountants (IFAC) and the Pan African Federation of Accountants (PAFA). The qualification was revised and launched on 17 August 2017 and was rebranded to the ((Chartered Accountant Zambia)), a three tiered professional programme comprising three levels: Knowledge, Application and Advisory Levels. Following successful completion of the Advisory level, therefore graduate undertakes a compulsory three-year practical training programme at audit senior position (Accountant, Auditor) under the supervision of a Chartered Accountant. Fully qualified professional accountants holding qualifications from other recognised accounting bodies and also holding a minimum of three years practical experience, three such years being post qualifying, can also be admitted into membership.

Knowledge:
Comprises six subjects that prepare one for clerical accounting work, usually carried out by Accounts Assistants.
1.1– Financial Accounting
1.2 – Business Statistic.  1.3 – Business Economics
1.4 - Commercial & Company Law
1.5 – Management theories and Practice                     
1.6 – Business Communication

Application Level:
The intermediate stage covers five subjects. It prepares the student for general accounting work carried out by middle management accounting officers.
2.1 – Financial Reporting
2.2 – Management Accounting
2.3 – Auditing
2.4 - Taxation
2.5 - Financial Management.

Advisory Level:
The final stage that covers five subjects and prepares the student for high level advisory accounting work usually carried out by Chief financial officers. Holders of an accounting professional qualification may enter this level directly.
P3.1 – Advanced Financial Reporting
3.2 - Advanced Audit & Assurance
3.3 - Strategic Business Analysis
3.4 - Advanced Taxation
3.5 – Advanced Management Accounting
3.6 – Advanced Financial Management
3.7 - Public Sector Audits and Assurance
3.8 - Public Sector Financial Management

The Advisory has three compulsory papers that is; 3.1, 3.2 and 3.3.
The other subjects are divided into three routes namely; 
Business route comprising
3.5 & 3.6
Public Practice route comprising
3.4 & 3.7
Public Sector route comprising
3.7 & 3.8
The CA status is designated after successful completion of examinations and compulsory three-year practical training under the mentorship of a Chartered Accountant either at Associate or Fellowship Status. The examination does not consist of Continuous Assessment.

References

Organisations based in Zambia
Organizations established in 1982
1982 establishments in Zambia
Member bodies of the International Federation of Accountants